A discomix, or simply a disco, is an extended reggae 12-inch single that typically features the vocal track followed by a dub version or a deejay version of the same track. The format became popular in the mid-1970s, with the extended bass range of 12-inch singles being better suited to dub music. The first big hit discomix was "Ya Ho" by The Jays and Ranking Trevor, released in 1976. The popularity of the format led to Black Echoes magazine (later Echoes) publishing a weekly 'Reggae Disco Chart'.

References

External links
Discomix at Reggaepedia

Audio storage
Recorded music